Pine Grove is an unincorporated community in Fayette County, West Virginia, United States. It lies off U.S. Highway 19 on County Route 5/3.

Unincorporated communities in Fayette County, West Virginia
Unincorporated communities in West Virginia